In economics, gains from trade are the net benefits to economic agents  from being allowed an increase in voluntary trading with each other.  In technical terms, they are the increase of consumer surplus plus producer surplus from lower tariffs or otherwise liberalizing trade.

Dynamics 
Gains from trade are commonly described as resulting from:
 specialization in production from division of labor, economies of scale, scope,  and agglomeration and relative availability of factor resources in types of output by farms, businesses, location  and economies
 a resulting increase in total output possibilities
 trade  through markets from sale of one type of output for other, more highly valued goods.
 
Market incentives, such as reflected in prices of outputs and inputs, are theorized to attract factors of production, including labor,  into activities according to comparative advantage, that is,  for which they each have a low opportunity cost. The factor owners then use their increased income from such specialization to buy more-valued goods of which they would otherwise be high-cost producers, hence their gains from trade.  The concept may be applied to an entire economy for the alternatives of autarky (no trade) or trade.  A measure of total gains from trade is the sum of consumer surplus and producer profits or,  more roughly, the increased output from specialization in production with resulting trade.  Gains from trade may also refer to net benefits to a country from lowering barriers to trade such as tariffs on imports.

David Ricardo in 1817 first clearly stated and proved the principle of comparative advantage,  termed a "fundamental analytical explanation" for the source of gains from trade. But from publication of Adam Smith's The Wealth of Nations in 1776, it was  widely argued, that, with competition and absent market distortions,  such gains are positive in moving toward free trade and away from autarky or prohibitively high import tariffs.  Rigorous early contemporary statements of the conditions under which this proposition holds are found in Samuelson in 1939 and 1962. For the analytically tractable general case of Arrow-Debreu goods, formal proofs came in 1972 for  determining the condition of no losers in moving from autarky  toward free trade.

The proof does not state that no involvement is the best economic outcome.  Rather, a large economy might be able to set taxes and subsidies to its benefit at the expense of other economies.  Later results of Kemp and others showed that in an Arrow-Debreu world with a system of lump-sum compensatory mechanisms, corresponding to a customs union for a given subset set of countries (described by free trade among a group of economies and a common set of tariffs), there is a common set of world''' tariffs such that no country would be worse off than in the smaller customs union. The suggestion is that if a customs union has advantages for an economy, there is a worldwide customs union that is at least as good for each country in the world.

Measurement

Classical economists maintain that there are two methods to measure the gains from trade: 1) international trade increases national income which helps us to get low priced imports; 2) gains are measured in terms of trade. To measure the gains from the trade, comparison of a country's cost of production with a foreign country's cost of production for the same product is required. However, it is very difficult to acquire the knowledge of cost of production and cost of imports in a domestic country. Therefore, terms of trade method is preferable to measure the gains from trade.

Factors affecting gains 

There are several factors which determine the gains from international trade:

 Differences in cost ratio: The gains from international trade depends upon the cost ratios of differences in comparative cost ratios in the two trading countries. The smaller the difference between exchange rate and cost of production the smaller the gains from trade and vice versa.
 Demand and supply: If a country has elastic demand and supply gains the gains from trade are higher than if demand and supply are inelastic.
 Factor availability: International trade is based on the specialization and a country specializes depending upon the availability of factors of production. It will increase the domestic cost ratios and thereby the gains from trade.
 Size of country: If a country is small in size it is relatively easy for them to specialize in the production of one commodity and export the surplus production to a large country and can get more gains from international trade. Whereas if a country is large in size then they have to specialize in more than one good because the excess production of only one commodity can not be exported fully to a small sized country as the demand for good will reduce very frequently. So the smaller the size of the country, the larger the gain from trade.
 Terms of Trade: Gains from trade will depend upon the terms of trade. If the cost ratio and terms of trade are closer to each other more will be the gains from trade of the participating countries.
 Productive Efficiency: An increase in the productive efficiency of a country also determines its gains from trade as it lowers the cost of production and price of the goods. As a result, the country importing  gains by importing cheap goods.

Static and dynamic gains from trade

The gains from trade can be clad into static and dynamic gains from trades. Static Gains means the increase in social welfare as a result of maximized national output due to optimum utilization of country's factor endowments or resources. Dynamic gains from trade, are those benefits which accelerate economic growth of the participating countries.

Static gains are the result of the operation of the theory of comparative cost in the field of foreign trade. On this principle countries make the optimum use of their available resources so that their national output is greater which also raises the level of social welfare in the country. When there is an introduction of foreign trade in the economy the result is called the static gains from trade.

Dynamic gains from trade relate to economic development of the economy. Specialization of the country for the production of best suited commodities which result in a large volume of quality production which promotes growth. Thus the extension of domestic market to foreign market will accelerate economic growth.

See also
Comparative advantage
Doux commerce
Free trade
Terms of trade
Trade

Notes

References
 Jagdish N. Bhagwati, Arvind Panagariya, and T. N. Srinivasan, 1998, 2nd ed. Lectures on International Trade, ch. 18 & 19, pp. 265-79.
 Giovanni Facchini and Gerald Willmann, 2001. "Pareto Gains from Trade," Economia Politica, pp. 207-216. 1999 preprint  version.
 Murray C. Kemp, 1995.  The Gains from Trade and the Gains From Aid: Essays in International Trade Theory.
 Paul R. Krugman, 1987. "Is Free Trade Passé?" Journal of Economic Perspectives, 1(2), pp. 131-144. 
 Joy Mazumdar, 1996. "Do Static Gains from Trade Lead to Medium-Run Growth?" Journal of Political Economy'', 104(6), 1996, pp. 1328-1337. 
 Dr, Mrs. Mangla P. Jahgle, Dr. Mrs. Madhura Joshi, Mrs. Sumati V. Shinde,  "International Economics",ed 2008, ch 5, pp 122–125
 M.L Jhingan,"International Economics",ed 2008,ch 16,pp 155
 K.K. Dewett, "Modern Economic Theory",2008,ch 55,pp 671–672

External links
 Gains from Trade, from "International Trade," Arnold Kling
 Summary: Main Points on Economic Efficiency and the Gains from Trade, including graphs for consumer surplus and producer surplus
 , Gains from internal trade
  Oscar Volij

Free trade
Urban, rural, and regional economics